Flow Festival is a music festival, taking place annually in Helsinki, Finland. The event is known for its varied selection of lineup and arts exhibition.

Line-ups
All information taken from the Flow website. The 2004 festival lineup is presented in alphabetical order. From 2005 onward, the lineups are presented from the earliest to latest set times.

2004

Club Wahoo! with Leftside Ensemble DJs
Jazzanova
Jori Hulkkonen vs Nuspirit Helsinki DJs (Lil' Tony & Ender): Made in Detroit
Lifesaver presents: MC Ruudolf, Hypeman Karri Koira & DJ Allekirjoittanut
Lifesaver Record Store DJs Didier, Anonymous, Pirrka & Pablo
Marlena Shaw
Nicola Conte
Norman Jay
Nuspirit Helsinki live featuring Teddy Rok and Guests
Ricky-Tick Records presents: DJ Go-Go Antti with August Ekström, Dalindèo and Nicola Conte
Seiji (Bugz in the Attic) with MC MG
The Five Corners Quintet
Ty

2005
Flow Live
Friday: Husky Rescue Big Band Special, King Britt presents Sister Gertrude Morgan, Omar
Saturday: Mark Murphy with The Five Corners Quintet, The Five Corners Quintet feat. Okou, Marva Whitney

Rocking Chair Club
Friday: DJ Didier, DJ Kenny "Dope" Gonzalez
Saturday: DJ Anonymous, DJ Osunlade, DJ Spinna

Redroom
Friday: Inner City of Berlin featuring Âme & Dixon
Saturday: Made in Detroit feat. Jori Hulkkonen, Lil Tony & Ender

Makasiinit Yard
Friday: Ville Valo & Kalle Hakkarainen: Odotustila
Saturday: JazzCotech Dancers

Flow Record Fair
Saturday: Lifesaver vs Wahoo vs Straight No Chaser Magazine DJ's

2006
Flow Yard
Friday: Siiri Nordin & The Sweeters, TV-resistori, Aavikko, Natha / Vri-il, Happy Mondays, Gravenhurst
Saturday: Lifesaver DJs Didier & Anonymous, Raw Fusion Sound System, Hearin' Aid, U Brown & Sound Explosion Riddim Section, Ali Shaheed Muhammad, Stones Throw Records presents feat. Oh No, Wildchild & Vinia Mojica, Romes, Dudley Perkins & Georgia Anne Muldrow, Candi Staton
Sunday: Wahoo, Quintessence, Dalindèo feat. Michiko, The Five Corners Quintet & One, José González

Valkoinen sali
Friday: Toinen Linja, Katusea Soundsystem, Lindstrøm & Prins Thomas, Coldcut, Underground Resistance presents Galaxy 2 Galaxy & Los Hermanos
Saturday: Helsinki Ghetto Bass Patrol, Tortured Soul, Henrik Schwarz, Aril Brikha, Jazzanova, Moodymann

Kuudes linja
Friday: Club Gäng!, Happy Mondays
Saturday: Lifesaver DJs Didier & Anonymous, Edan with Dagha

Flow-afterparty, Rose Garden
Saturday: Acid Kings, Made in Chicago featuring DJs Jori Hulkkonen, Ender & Lil' Tony

2007
Outdoor Stage
Friday: Nicole Willis & The Soul Investigators, Pepe Deluxé, Terry Callier, CocoRosie
Saturday: Rättö ja Lehtisalo, The Valkyrians, Architecture in Helsinki, Op:l Bastards, !!!, ESG
Sunday: Risto, Tuomo Prättälä, Jenny Wilson, Bebel Gilberto

Tent
Friday: Pooma, K-X-P, Samae Koskinen, The Five Corners Quintet, Jukka Eskola, The Stance Brothers, Timo Lassy, DJ Antti Eerikäinen
Saturday: Andreas Söderström Solo, Shogun Kunitoki, Quiet Village, Hannulelauri, Luomo, Jori Hulkkonen
Sunday: Eleanoora Rosenholm, Jaakko Eino Kalevi, Korpi Ensemble, Katusea Soundsystem

Club
Friday: Matthew Jonson, Tiefschwarz, Carl Craig
Saturday: Cut Chemist, Gilles Peterson, Cosmo Baker

2008
Main Stage
Friday: Asa, Jamie Lidell, Kings of Convenience, Múm
Saturday: Astrid Swan, Kuusum un Profeetta, Raappana & The Sound Explosion, Sébastien Tellier, CSS, The Roots
Sunday: Reino & the Rhinos, The Five Corners Quintet, Señor Coconut and His Orchestra feat. Argenis Brito, Martha Reeves & The Vandellas, Cut Copy

Tent Stage
Friday: DJ Anonymous & Fiskars B2B Dance Classics Extravaganza, Jesse, Le Corps Mince de Françoise, 22-Pistepirkko, Christian Prommer's Drumlesson, Crystal Castles
Saturday: Âme & Lil Tony Cosmic Roots, TV OFF, Joose Keskitalo & Kolmas Maailmanpalo, Detektivbyrån, Borko, Eagle Boston, Hidria Spacefolk, Huoratron
Sunday: Astro Can Caravan, Plutonium 74, Ane Brun, José James, Moritz von Oswald Trio feat. Vladislav Delay

Club Voimala
Friday: Kiki, Âme, Sebo K, M.A.N.D.Y.
Saturday: Top Billin DJs & Anonymous, DJ Eli Escobar, Massive B, DJ Funk

Club Tiivistämö
Friday: Harmönia presents Masters Of Skweee! Boyz of Caligula, Mesak, Randy Barracuda, V.C., Claws Cousteau, Michael Black Electro, PJVM; Grime/Dub Step: Caspa & Rusko + Tes La Rok & Dead-O, Jungle & J-Tek: DJ Randall + Del & Boj Lucki
Saturday: Artificial Latvamäki, Samuli Kemppi, Mr Velcro Fastener, Imatran Voima, Jori Hulkkonen, Robert Hood

2009
Concert
Thursday: Aavikko, Avid Symphony Orchestra, Kraftwerk

Main Stage
Friday: Oi pojat, Frida Hyvönen, Yann Tiersen, New Young Pony Club, Vampire Weekend
Saturday: Regina, Röyhkä & Rättö & Lehtisalo, Hypnotic Brass Ensemble, Seun Kuti & Egypt 80, White Lies, Grace Jones
Sunday: Jupiter Soul Revue, Ricky-Tick Records Sound Bash, Jenny Wilson, Nitin Sawhney, Lily Allen, Fever Ray

Tent Stage
Friday: The Terror Pigeon Dance Revolt, HeartsRevolution, Pintandwefall, Le Corps Mince de Françoise, Joensuu 1685, Roots Manuva, Ladyhawke
Saturday: Villa Nah, Rubik, Eero Johannes, Vivian Girls, Jazzanova, Flying Lotus, Handsome Furs, The Juan MacLean
Sunday: Vuk, Cats on Fire, The Capital Beat, Collie Buddz & The New Kingston Band, The Big Pink, Final Fantasy

Voimala
Friday: Top Billin DJs & New Judas DJs, DJ Mehdi, Huoratron
Saturday: Lil Tony, Kerri Chandler, A Critical Mass, Radio Slave

Tiivistämö
Friday: Organ, Mika Vainio, Andreas Tilliander, MI NI MA, Scuba
Saturday: Tes La Rok, Loefah and MC Sgt Pokes, Kode9, David Rodigan

Makasiini
Friday: Ponytail, Sönderbyggd, Nuslux, DJ Sniff
Saturday: Tuuli Inari, Kuupuu, Nim, Gudrun Gut

2010
Concert
Wednesday: Kap Kap, LCD Soundsystem, The Chemical Brothers

Main Stage
Friday: Jimi Tenor & Tony Allen, Broken Bells, Air, Big Boi
Saturday: Maria Gasolina, Uusi Fantasia, Husky Rescue, Timo Lassy Orchestra with José James, Robyn, M.I.A.
Sunday: Yona & Orkesteri Liikkuvat Pilvet, Ricky-Tick Big Band, Konono Nº1, Caribou, The xx

Tent Stage
Friday: Kiki Pau, Villa Nah, Circle, The Drums
Saturday: Myron & E with The Soul Investigators, K-X-P, Surfer Blood, Junip, Omar Souleyman, Beach House
Sunday: Dinosauruxia, Kemmuru, The Radio Dept., Girls, RotFront, Marina and the Diamonds

Voimala Concert
Friday: Ulver
Saturday: Owen Pallett
Sunday: Ballaké Sissoko

Voimala Club
Friday: Four Tet, Ricardo Villalobos
Saturday: Dead-O, Tes La Rok, Joker & Nomad, Diplo

Tent Club
Friday: Misf*ts, Aeroplane, Magnetic Man
Saturday: Major Lazer, Rye Rye, Sleigh Bells

Flow Back Yard
Friday: Didier's Sound Spectrum, Awesome Tapes From Africa, Bongo Rock
Saturday: DJ Fummer, DJ Graalin Maljaakko & DJ Fiskars, Jaakko & Jay, DJ Lil Tony, DJ Harvey, Hannulelauri
Sunday: Sintti Silmusuu, Vallilan Tango, We Love Helsinki, Darya & Månskensorkestern, We Love Helsinki

Tiivistämö
Friday: Sami Kukka, Tsembla, Puiset Heilat, Islaja, Keränen, Rapa & Roksette Rock N Roll Spectacle
Saturday: Grey Park, Ona Kamu, Lau Nau, Taco Bells, Arch of Neo, Vladislav Delay, Jori Hulkkonen, Clouds
Sunday: Ville Leinonen & Majakan Soittokunta, Hei, Pekko Käppi, Marjatta, Tomutonttu, Kiila

2011
Main Stage
Friday: Asa Masa, Midlake, MF Doom, Röyksopp
Saturday: Yona & Orkesteri Liikkuvat Pilvet, Magenta Skycode, Jo Stance, Iron & Wine, Lykke Li, Empire of the Sun
Sunday: Reino & the Rhinos, Jukka Eskola Quintet with Strings, Sly and Robbie featuring Junior Reid, Twin Shadow, Kanye West

Nokia Lounge
Friday: Top Billin, Yé Yé
Saturday: Spoek Mathambo, Top Billin, Girl Unit, Sharkslayer
Sunday: Ionik, Motor City Drum Ensemble, Robert Rodriguez, Top Billin

Nokia Blue Tent
Friday: French Films, Destroyer, The Budos Band, Warpaint, El Guincho, Ariel Pink's Haunted Graffiti
Saturday: Delay Trees, Regina, The Pains of Being Pure at Heart, Mayer Hawthorne, Shantel & Bucovina Club Orkestar, Janelle Monáe, The Human League
Sunday: Astro Can Caravan, Minä ja Ville Ahonen, Rubik, Mogwai, Battles, James Blake

Black Tent
Friday: Herman Prime, About Group, Matthew Dear, House Party, Hercules and Love Affair, Jori Hulkkonen, Cosmo Baker, Matias Aguayo
Saturday: Toni Halo, Renaissance Man, Hannulelauri, Shine 2009, The Dø, Roberto Rodriguez, Tensnake, DJ Anonymous, KiNK, DJ Koze
Sunday: Katerina, The Do-Over Hosted by Aloe Blacc, Jamie Woon, Horse Meat Disco

Voimala Club
Friday: Non Person featuring Sarah Kivi, Teeth, Blawan, Pearson Sound, Joy Orbison, Tes La Rok
Saturday: Desto featuring Jimi Tenor, 2562, Martyn, Oni Ayhun, Pantha du Prince
Sunday: Marcel Dettmann, Ben Klock, Shed

Voimala Live
Friday: Hauschka featuring Samuli Kosminen
Saturday: Mirel Wagner, First Aid Kit
Sunday: Tony Trischka

Open Source Stage
Friday: DJ Tuipe, Mimosa, Nightsatan, Eevil Stöö, Holy Moly DJs Mike Dunn Special
Saturday: DJ Tuipe, Wannabe Ballerinas, Stockers!, MC Taakibörstä PA 2011 Reunion, Poutatorvi, Mokka & Kinnunen
Sunday: Ateneumin Ämpärirumpali, Michael Cassette, Eero Johaness Jakaa Sisältöä, Joda + Rudy + Särre Freestyle, DJ Tuipe

Cirko
Friday: Avarus, Dxxxa & Nukkehallitus, Ignatz, Mikko Innanen & Innkvisitio
Saturday: Murcof + AntiVJ, Dolphins Into the Future, Fricara Pacchu, Barry Andrewsin Disko, Kawaguchi Masami's New Rock Syndicate
Sunday: Bridget Hayden, Keuhkot, Kemialliset Ystävät, Pretty Lightning

Wine & Sapas
Friday: Sväng
Saturday: Timo Lassy Trio
Sunday: Lepistö & Lehti

Back Yard
Friday: Komposti Sound System, Analog Africa Soundsystem, Danny Krivit
Saturday: Tixa, T.A. Kaukolampi, Vilunki, Odj Harri, Joakim Haugland, A Love from Outer Space (Andrew Weatherall & Sean Johnston)
Sunday: We Love Helsinki

Champagne Bar
Friday: J-Laini, Käki
Saturday: Aromi, Poika & Hirviö
Sunday: Esko Routamaa, Käki

2012
Main Stage
Friday: Jukka Poika, Yann Tiersen, Miike Snow, Lykke Li
Saturday: Dumari & Spuget, Nicole Willis & The Soul Investigators, Horace Andy and Dub Asante, Saint Etienne, The Black Keys
Sunday: Manna, French Films, Feist, Björk

The Other Sound @ Cirko
Friday: Toblerones, Seremonia, Motelli Skronkle, Orchestra of Spheres, Oneohtrix Point Never
Saturday: Tuusanuuskat, Pekka Airaksinen, Michael Flower, Fennesz & Lillevan, The Splits, Sleep ∞ Over
Sunday: Unela, Jarse, Goodiepal, Bear Bones Lay Low, Quiltland, Heatsick

Nokia Blue Tent
Wednesday: Joose Keskitalo & Kolmas Maailmanpalo, Bon Iver
Friday: Stockers!, Siinai + Moonface, A$AP Rocky, Eevil Stöö, DJ Kridlokk & Koksukoo, Charles Bradley and His Extraordinaires
Saturday: Miau, Black Twig, Ane Brun, Swans, Nicolas Jaar, Richie Hawtin
Sunday: Atlético Kumpula, Burning Hearts, Pepe Deluxé, Dâm-Funk, The War on Drugs, St. Vincent

Nokia Lounge
Friday: Harju Youth Center Presents: Focus & AT, Nada, Clap Dance DJs, Bicep, Cosmo Baker
Saturday: Harju Youth Center Presents: Selekta Ssoze & DJ Kuk Norris, Just Paha, Tytti, Katerina, Lauri Soini
Sunday: Karri Koira, Didier, Daniel Savio, Harvest

Black Tent
Friday: Kemmuru, Korallreven, Gracias, AraabMuzik, Four Tet & Caribou
Saturday: Trevor Deep Jr, Beverly Girls, Roberto Rodriguez, Lindstrøm, Kindness, Huoratron, Chromatics
Sunday: Bendagram, Sin Cos Tan, Friends, Kuusumun Profeetta, Shangaan Electro

Open Source Stage
Friday: Straktobeam, Asta Emilia & Omor, Antero Lindgren, Kultabassokerho Freestyle Open
Saturday: Hermanni Turkki, Kari Tapiiri + Akira + Dallas = Dakiiri, Crystal Clears, Karri Koira, Veturimiehet Heiluttaa Plays Autiomaa
Sunday: Koponen & Sirén, Pretty Bruises Squad, Memmy Posse, Phantom

Voimala Concert
Friday: Sun Araw
Saturday: Mikko Joensuu
Sunday: Jason Moran, A Winged Victory for the Sullen

Wastelands
Friday: Rime, Kolektif Istanbul, Tamikrest
Saturday: Verneri Pohjola, Awesome Tapes From Africa, Baba Zula, Jason Moran & The Bandwagon
Sunday: Murat Meric, Tiiu Helinä, Jason Moran & the Bandwagon, Orchestre Poly-Rythmo de Cotonou

Voimala Club
Friday: Monolake, Africa Hitech, Actress
Saturday: Arch of Neo, Desto, Pinch

Tiivistämö
Friday: Elifantree
Saturday: Mopo
Sunday: Herd

Backyard
Friday: Super Mazembe, Bongo Rock feat. Cornell Campbell, Theo Parrish, Nina Kraviz
Saturday: Yön Syke feat. Jaakko Eino Kalevi, Erkko, Anonymous, Mika Snickars
Sunday: We Love Helsinki

Champagne Bar & Lounge
Friday: Poika & Hirviö, Fag You DJs
Saturday: Tuipe & Alari Orav, Irene Kostas & Kristiina Männikkö, Odj Harri & Käki
Sunday: Sheikki Sheikki, ODJ TG & Super-Samuli, Sonny T

2013
Opening Concert
Wednesday: Kate Boy, Tarek Warm Up, The Knife

Main Stage
Friday: Dalindèo, Rubik, Kendrick Lamar, Alicia Keys
Saturday: Samae Koskisen Korvalääke, Jens Lekman, Cody Chesnutt, Nick Cave and the Bad Seeds
Sunday: Ricky-Tick Big Band & Julkinen Sana, Public Enemy, Of Monsters and Men, Kraftwerk 3D Show

Nokia Blue Tent
Friday: Häxjesus, Satellite Stories, Minä ja Ville Ahonen, Cat Power, Moderat
Saturday: Sarah Kivi & Non-Orchestra, Karri Koira, Austra, Nicole Willis & the Soul Investigators, My Bloody Valentine, Beach House
Sunday: Antero Lindgren, Husky Rescue, Godspeed You! Black Emperor, Bat for Lashes, Grimes

Black Tent
Friday: Yöt, Autre Ne Veut, K-X-P, Mykki Blanco, Huoratron
Saturday: Jaakko Eino Kalevi, Black Lizard, Pää Kii, Loost Koos, Parquet Courts, Factory Floor, Mount Kimbie
Sunday: Laineen Kasperi & Palava Kaupunki, Angel Haze, Haim, Disclosure, Goat

Balloon 360° Stage
Friday: Kahden Miehen Galaksi, The Lieblings, Timo Lassy Band, Jupiter & Okwess International
Saturday: Jaakko Laitinen & Väärä Raha, Aino Venna, Woods, Serenity Ensemble, Ebo Taylor & The Odapajan
Sunday: Black Motor & Verneri Pohjola, Jacco Gardner, Ravi Coltrane Quintet, Junip

The Other Sound
Friday: Käppi/Nyrhinen, Atom™, Chicaloyoh, Ghédalia Tazartès, U.S. Girls, Blixa Bargeld
Saturday: Panssarijuna, Urpf Lanze, Jyrki Nissinen & Hot Visions, Lau Nau, Love Cult, Circuit Des Yeux, Astral Social Club
Sunday: Kumma Heppu & Lopunajan Voidellut, Olimpia Splendid, Orphan Fairytale, Veli-Matti o Äijälä and the Kolmas, Julia Holter, Invader Ace

RBMA Backyard
Friday: Desto, Levon Zoltar, Jackmaster, Karenn, Maya Jane Coles
Saturday: Newhouse, Cola & Jimmu, Tim Sweeney, Space Dimension Controller, Lil Tony, Tensnake, Âme
Sunday: Reggae Sundays: Bitty McLean, Gappy Ranks and Christopher Ellis + more

Heineken O.S.S
Friday: Noah Kin, Anni, Vähäiset Äänet, Tuuttimörkö
Saturday: WGF, Jonna, Lieminen, DJPP All Stars
Sunday: Loft Apartment, Ballereinot, Oukkidouppi, Fotoshop

Champagne Bar & Lounge
Friday: Paska Sohva, Hang the DJ, Sounds Like Kotibileet, Tavastian Lauantaidisko
Saturday: Club Bangles, Kingfishers, Disco Obscura, Hannulelauri, Wild Combo
Sunday: We Love Helsinki

Nokia Garage
Saturday: Femme En Fourrure, Teeth, Space Dimension Controller, Tim Sweeney
Sunday: Timo Lassy, Ionik, Cola & Jimmu, Ender & Lil Tony

Tiivistämö
Friday: We Jazz, Kok Trio
Saturday: We Jazz, Trio Urho
Sunday: We Jazz, Smith & Zenger

2014
Main Stage
Friday: Risto, Nina Persson, Jessie Ware, Yasiin Bey aka Mos Def
Saturday: Astrid Swan, Les Ambassadeurs (Salif Keita, Amadou Bagayoko & Cheick Tidiane Seck), Scandinavian Music Group, Manic Street Preachers, The National
Sunday: Iisa, Nyt Kolisee, Janelle Monáe, Outkast

Lumia Blue Tent
Friday: Magenta Skycode, Skrillex, Bonobo, Darkside
Saturday: Siinai, Bill Callahan, Plain Ride, Little Dragon, Kavinsky
Sunday: Tuomo, Blood Orange, Röyksopp & Robyn, Die Antwoord

Black Tent
Friday: DJ Kridlokk, Pusha T, Slint, Jon Hopkins, Paul Kalkbrenner
Saturday: Noah Kin, How to Dress Well, MØ, Joey Badass, James Holden, Jamie xx
Sunday: Eurocrack, Sin Cos Tan, Jungle, Action Bronson, Mac DeMarco, Slowdive

Balloon 360° Stage
Friday: Nuslux, Jenny Wilson, Mirel Wagner, Tinariwen
Saturday: Eetu Floor & Ystävät, Mopo, Sarah Kivi & Non-Orchestra, Neneh Cherry with RocketNumberNine, Marissa Nadler, Poliça
Sunday: Antti Lötjönen Quartet East, Pietarin Spektaakkeli, Real Estate, Mark Ernestus Presents Jeri-jeri

The Other Sound
Friday: Grateful Däd, Joose Keskitalo, Roy Hargrove Quintet, Monopoly Child Star Searchers, Hopeajärvi, High Wolf
Saturday: Nicolas Kivilinna, Antti Tolvi, J. Tolvi, Evan Parker, Kemialliset Ystävät, Miaux
Sunday: Tomoko Sauvage, Sound & Fury, Hauschka Kosminen Zeigler, Lentoliskot, Maan

Champagne Bar
Friday: DJ Lene, Paska Sohva, Käki & Harri Hännikäinen, Erkko & Harvest
Saturday: Esko Routamaa, New Hi-Fi Soundsystem, Calvin Girls, Must Have!, Guggenheim
Sunday: We Love Helsinki

Red Bull Music Academy Backyard
Friday: Katerina, Peanut Butter Wolf, Ron Morelli, I-F (Intergalactic FM, Viewlexx, Murdercapital), Ceephax Acid Crew, Evian Christ
Saturday: Trevor Deep Jr, Fred P, Didier, Illum Sphere, Young Marco
Sunday: Baris K, Optimo, Tama Sumo, Mark Ernestus, Machinedrum

Mixradio Music Hall (Tiivistämö)
Friday: Torttila Miljoona & 2013, Riitaoja, Aksim, Femme En Fourrure, Phantom, Sasse & Jori Hulkkonen
Saturday: Shivan Dragn, Mr. Peter Hayden, Katujen äänet, Paperi T & Khid, Teksti-TV 666, Aivovuoto, Samuli Kemppi
Sunday: Rauhatäti, Gim Kordon, Death Hawks, St. Lucia, Beastmilk, Big Ups, Jaakko Eino Kalevi

2015
Main Stage
Friday: Yona, Lianne La Havas, CHIC featuring Nile Rodgers, Major Lazer
Saturday: Regina, Belle and Sebastian, Róisín Murphy, Pet Shop Boys
Sunday: Emma Salokoski, Beck, Florence and the Machine

Lapin Kulta Blue Tent
Friday: Manna, DOPE HKI, The War on Drugs, Ride
Saturday: French Films, Foxygen, Paperi T, Years & Years, Future Islands
Sunday: Mirel Wagner, Tyler, the Creator, Flying Lotus, Alt-J

Black Tent
Friday: Elliphant, Diplo, Clark, Run the Jewels
Saturday: LCMDF, Shamir, Skepta & Wiley, ILoveMakonnen, Evian Christ, Tiga
Sunday: Black Lizard, K-X-P, Todd Terje & The Olsens, Tove Lo, Future Brown

Bright Balloon 360° Stage
Friday: Verneri Pohjola Quartet, Lännen-Jukka, Songhoy Blues
Saturday: Dave Lindholm, Jukka Nousiainen, Forever Pavot, Reino Nordin, Seinabo Sey, Islam Chipsy
Sunday: John McGregor featuring Samuli Kosminen & Jarmo Saari, Kakkmaddafakka, Timo Lassy Band, Natalie Prass

The Other Sound (Voimala)
Friday: Olavi Louhivuori, The Space Lady, Grouper, Arthur Russell's Instrumentals Live Show, Vladislav Delay
Saturday: defunensemble, Hockey Night, O Samuli A, Marsen Jules, Mika Vainio, Filastine & Nova
Sunday: NYKY Ensemble, Janne Westerlund, Dog Life, Modern Feelings, The Mystic Revelation of Teppo Repo

Resident Advisor Backyard
Friday: J. Lindroos & Denzel, DJ Ender, Mano Le Tough, Dixon, Seth Troxler
Saturday: Kristiina Männikkö, Lauri Soini, Juho Kusti, Solar, Mr. G, Joey Anderson
Sunday: Emma Valtonen, Trevor Deep Jr, Lil Tony, Nina Kraviz

Tiivistämö
Friday: Hisko Detria, Have You Ever Seen the Jane Fonda Aerobic VHS?, Lasten Hautausmaa, Lorentz, Sairas T & OD Kokemus & O'Malley
Saturday: E-Musikgruppe Lux Ohr, Lokit, Likanen Etelä, Seksihullut, Kesä, Death Team, Shadowplay
Sunday: Kairon; IRSE!, Cats of Transnistria, Maaseudun Tulevaisuus, Musta Paraati, Cityman, Ronskibiitti

Champagne Bar & Lounge
Friday: Sansibar, Esko Routamaa, Janne X, Emma Kemppainen & Rony Rex
Saturday: D.R.E.A.M., Juha Mäki, You Are the Light, Scifibimboes, La Persé
Sunday: Samu-Jussi Koski, Synteettinen Suomi, Olli Koponen, Teemu Keisteri, Skenikswee & Harvest

2016
Main Stage
Friday: Raappana & New Riddim Crew, Laura Mvula, Iggy Pop, Massive Attack & Young Fathers
Saturday: Ricky-Tick Big Band & Julkinen Sana featuring Agit-Cirk, Liima, The Last Shadow Puppets, FKA twigs
Sunday: J. Karjalainen, Anderson .Paak & The Free Nationals, Sia

Lapin Kulta Red Arena
Friday: Jaakko Eino Kalevi, Lil B, Mikko Joensuu, Jamie xx
Saturday: Moonface & Siinai, Rooxx, Chvrches, M83, Morrissey
Sunday: Death Hawks, Ruger Hauer featuring Regina, Daughter, New Order, Anohni

Black Tent
Friday: Eevil Stöö, Kingfish, Stormzy, Four Tet, Sleaford Mods, Savages
Saturday: Itä-Hollola Installaatio, Ronya, View, Gettomasa, Hercules & Love Affair, Floating Points
Sunday: Khid, Alma, Dua Lipa, Descendents, Thee Oh Sees, Kaytranada

Zalando Factory
Friday: Töölön Ketterä, Elias Gould, Feels, Mura Masa
Saturday: Lake Jons, Litku Klemetti & Tuntematon numero, Noëp, Moa Pillar
Sunday: Räjäyttäjät, RPK, Venior, Karina

Bright Balloon 360° Stage
Friday: Irina Björklund, Teddy's West Coasters, A-WA, Paperi T x Pekka Kuusisto x Samuli Kosminen, Ata Kak
Saturday: Kalevi Louhivuori Quintet, Laraaji, Röyhkä/Inginmaa/Hypnomen, Mopo & Ville Leinonen, Dungen, Pat Thomas & Kwashibu Area Band
Sunday: Jukka Eskola Soul Trio+, Kosminen Rönkkö!, Thundercat, Kamasi Washington, Nicole Willis & Jimi Tenor & Tony Allen

The Other Sound
Friday: Ghost Box Project: Linda#faceinthemirror, Megalodon Collective, Pink Twins, Tsembla, William Basinski, Anna von Hausswolff
Saturday: NYKY Ensemble, Elatu Nessa, Destroyer2048, Draama-Helmi, The SultanS, Holly Herndon
Sunday: Osuma Ensemble, Myttys, Tapio & Tuomi Duo, Ian William Craig, Running, Lauri Ainala featuring Olli Ainala

Voimala
Friday: Mirage Man, DJ Pierre, Paula Temple, Ben Klock
Saturday: Samuli Kemppi, Voices from the Lake, Oscar Mulero, Jeff Mills
Sunday: Twwth, Ripatti, Arca & Jesse Kanda, Shackleton, Pantha du Prince

Champagne Bar & Lounge
Friday: Flashback Future, Linda Lazarov, Sexdate, Aaro DiCosta, Plattenbauten, Tero Männikkö, Jayda G
Saturday: Club Anvil, Katri Koivula, Jopo Símeon K, Better Things To Do, Kasko, Lauri Soini, Jussi Kantonen & Anssi Nieminen, Lipelis
Sunday: DJ Missstiff, Dj Windows95man, Apache Lifeforms, VG+ & Herkules, Jehu, Marc Fred, Jamie Tiller

Resident Advisor Backyard
Friday: Jokki & Jimi, JL, Fummer, Roman Flügel, The Black Madonna, Helena Hauff
Saturday: Noah Kin, Kristiina Männikkö, Trevor Deep Jr, Red Axes, Lil Tony, Kim Ann Foxman
Sunday: Sansibar, Villa Nah, Katerina, John Talabot

2017
Main Stage
Friday: Satellite Stories, Beth Ditto, Lana Del Rey
Saturday: Pykäri featuring Ahjo Ensemble, Danny Brown, Goldfrapp, The xx
Sunday: Elias Gould, Monsp Records 20th anniversary show, Ryan Adams, Frank Ocean

Lapin Kulta Red Arena
Friday: Gasellit, Young Thug, Aphex Twin, London Grammar
Saturday: MC Taakibörsta, Sparks, Sampha, Alma, Flume
Sunday: Astrid Swan, Ceebrolistics, The Afghan Whigs, Vince Staples, Moderat

Zalando Black Tent
Friday: Kauriinmetsästäjät, Litku Klemetti, Oranssi Pazuzu, Femme En Fourrure, Car Seat Headrest, Black Lips
Saturday: Töölön Ketterä, The Holy, Silvana Imam, Front 242, Bicep, Death Grips
Sunday: Vesta, Kube, Princess Nokia, Jenny Hval, Angel Olsen, Mr. Fingers

Bright Balloon 360°
Friday: Milo & Moses, Skott, Joshua Redman, Roy Ayers, Ibibio Sound Machine
Saturday: VIRTA, Julie Byrne, Max Jury, Timo Lassy Band featuring Eero Koivistoinen & Joyce, Mikko Joensuu, Janka Nabay & The Bubu Gang
Sunday: Ona Kamu, Verneri Pohjola, Jonna Tervomaa, Linnea Olsson, BadBadNotGood, Fatoumata Diawara & Hindi Zahra

Resident Advisor Front Yard
Friday: Vladimir Ivković B2B Lauri Soini, Clara 3000, Willow, Maceo Plex
Saturday: Linda Lazarov, Powder, Soichi Terada, Jon Hopkins, Inga Mauer, Lil Tony
Sunday: DJ Ender, Sadar Bahar, Marie Davidson, Fatima Yamaha, Lena Willikens

Voimala
Friday: Samuli Kemppi, Model 500, Lorenzo Senni, Planetary Assault Systems, Phase Fatale
Saturday: Kaitlyn Aurelia Smith, Emma Valtonen B2B Kristiina Männikkö, Nina Kraviz, Antti Salonen, Shed
Sunday: Mirage Man, SØS Gunver Ryberg, Timo Kaukolampi, Aleksi Perälä, The Hacker

The Other Sound
Friday: NYKY Ensemble, Laura Cannell, Plié, Black Motor, Veli-Matti o Äijälä and the Kolmas
Saturday: Midori Takada, Neutral, Tatsuru Arai, Selvhenter, LSDXOXO
Sunday: Dmitry Sinkovsky & Aapo Häkkinen, Mesak, Pekko Käppi & K:H:H:L, FAKA, Moor Mother

Red Garden
Friday: Jokki, Tero Männikkö & Apache Lifeforms, PEU, Joshi, Susanna Nuutinen, Denzel & Sansibar, Linda Lazarov & Kristiina Männikkö, Wes Baggaley
Saturday: Laura Mrls, Paula Koski, Ya Tosiba, Anna Myllyluoma, Loiriplukari, Marc Fred, Jenny Om, Olli Koponen, Mori Ra
Sunday: THRDEYEVSN, Ällistysnainen, Noah Kin, Tuuttimörkö, Onni Boi, Strictly Ysäri R&B, D.R.E.A.M., mobilegirl

Backyard
Friday: Irene Kostas, Timo Kaukolampi, Vladimir Ivkovic, J.Lindroos
Saturday: Esko Routamaa, Katerina, SØS Gunver Ryberg, Izabel
Sunday: Matti Nives, DJ Jonna, H_TDJ

Vinyl Market by We Jazz
Friday: Eero Löyttyjärv, Tommi P, Markus-setä, Arwi Lind, Martin Joela, Fredrik Lavik
Saturday: Jussi B, Matti Nives, Antti Eerikäinen, Liam Large, Fredrik Lavik, Arwi Lind, Markus-setä
Sunday: Tupla-Jukka, Tommi P, Antti Eerikäinen, Jussi B, Martin Joela, Eero Löyttyjärvi & Matti Nives, Liam Large

2018
Main Stage
Friday: Paperi T, Fleet Foxes, Patti Smith, Ms. Lauryn Hill
Saturday: Lake Jons, Vesta, Grizzly Bear, Arctic Monkeys
Sunday: Pyhimys, Lykke Li, Kendrick Lamar

Lapin Kulta Red Arena
Friday: Töölön Ketterä, Olavi Uusivirta, Mura Masa, Bonobo, Alma
Saturday: Kube x Eevil Stöö, D.R.E.A.M.G.I.R.L.S., Anna Puu, 6lack, Charlotte Gainsbourg
Sunday: Ruusut, Jorja Smith, Brockhampton, Fever Ray, St. Vincent

Seat Black Tent
Friday: Ibe, Kynnet, Kakka-Hätä 77, Onni Boi, Sigrid, Joensuu 1685
Saturday: Mio, DJ Ibusal, Shame, Noname, 3TM in 3D, D.A.F.
Sunday: Stig Dogg, K-X-P, Fred Ventura, View, Tangerine Dream

Balloon 360° Stage
Friday: Kardemimmit, Karina, The Limiñanas, Olli Ahvenlahti New Quartet, KOKOKO!
Saturday: Mopo, Jukka Eskola & Umo, Lxandra, Lau Nau & Poseidon, Anna of the North, Orlando Julius & The Heliocentrics
Sunday: Yona & Lumos, Jukka Nousiainen & Kumpp., Moses Sumney, Kamasi Washington, Kevin Morby

Resident Advisor Front Yard
Friday: Daniel Kayrouz & Justus Valtanen, Young Marco, Peggy Gou, Imatran Voima, Sonja Moonear, Sammy Dee B2B Zip
Saturday: Zozo, Phuong-Dan, The Egyptian Lover, Veronica Vasicka, Detroit in Effect, Helena Hauff
Sunday: Khidja, Moxie, Yaeji, Broken English Club, Moodymann, Gerd Janson

The Other Sound @ Sun Effects Voimala
Friday:  Meriheini Luoto & Mi-Rage, Terry Riley & Gyan Riley, Olli Aarni, Lena Platonos, Lubomyr Melnyk, Paavoharju
Saturday: Nyky Ensemble, Antti Tolvi, Abul Mogard, Suzanne Ciani, Kedr Livanskiy
Sunday: Hebo (Aapo Häkkinen & Dimitre Marinkev), Skidit Mega Disko, Suso Saiz, Tako, Michal Turtle, Jamie Tiller, Gigi Masin, Jamie Tiller B2B Tako, Jonny Nash

Backyard
Friday: Donna Leake, Dane, DJ Marcelle, Lil Tony, I-F
Saturday: Denzel & J.Lindroos, Dubby, Chee Shimizu, Sadar Bahar B2B Lee Collins, Joe Claussell
Sunday: Jen Ferrer, Cinema Royale, Ge-ology, Lauren Hansom, Colleen 'Cosmo' Murphy

Red Garden
Friday: Mikko Mattlar, Sansibar, Mad Miran, Peu, Lauri Soini, Volition Immanent, Kristiina Männikkö, Lena Popova
Saturday: Joshi, Hanna Ojanen, Siquiche, DJ Ramazotti, Handshaking, Bombarelli, Malin Nyqvist, DJ Lifegoals, Marju, Miska Tuiski, Marc Fred & Olli Koponen
Sunday: Masha, Krash Bandicute, Niko Hallikainen, Cute Cumber, Pekka Airaxin, Aake Kivalo, Yeboyah, Valley Girl, Yu Chuan, Pekko, Balearic Man, Mødya

Champagne Bar & Lounge
Friday: Eric Filipus & Imaginary _Frnd_
Saturday: Heikka Rissanen, Irene Kostas & Fummer
Sunday: Esko Routamaa

2019
Main Stage
Friday: Elias Gould, Earl Sweatshirt, Erykah Badu, Solange
Saturday: Gasellit, Seinabo Sey, Alma, Tame Impala
Sunday: J. Karjalainen, Chisu, Father John Misty, The Cure

Lapin Kulta Red Arena
Friday: Ville Valo & Agents, Ibe, Neneh Cherry, Pyhimys
Saturday: SOFA, Astrid Swan & Stina Koistinen featuring Owen Pallett, Ruusut, Blood Orange, Robyn
Sunday: Iisa, Pariisin Kevät, Modeselektor, Tove Lo, James Blake

Seat Black Tent
Friday: Karina, Katakombi, Maustetytöt, Slowthai, Nitzer Ebb, Leroy Burgess
Saturday: Bizi + F + Sitoi, Henrik!, Pond, Nao, Yves Tumor, Big Thief
Sunday: The Holy, Khruangbin, Mitski, Stereolab, Tommy Genesis

Nordea Globe Balloon
Friday: Elifantree, M, Jonathan Wilson, Makaya McCraven, BCUC
Saturday: Pekko Käppi & K:H:H:L, Timo Lassy & Teppo Mäkynen, Jaakko Eino Kalevi, Nubya Garcia, Jesse Markin, Nyege Nyege: Bamba Pana & Makaveli
Sunday: Katu Kaiku, Suad, Cüneyt Sepetçi, Pharoah Sanders Quartet, Flohio

Resident Advisor Front Yard
Friday: Denzel & J. Lindroos, CCL, Ash Lauryn, DJ Python, Eva Geist, Donato Dozzy
Saturday: Yu Chuan, Carista, Juliana Huxtable, Katerina B2B Linda Lazarov, Dream 2 Science, The Black Madonna
Sunday: DJ Yeboyah, D. Tiffany, Baba Stiltz, K-HAND, Nina Kraviz

Reaktor Backyard
Friday: Sebastian Holm & Marju, Tomi K, Tone B. Nimble, Mafalda, Levon Vincent, Fred P
Saturday: Olli Koponen, Raw Silk, Jeremy Spellacey, Valesuchi, Palms Trax, Theo Parrish, Sansibar
Sunday: Disco Obscura, Nosedrip, Darryn Jones, Lauri Soini, Willikens & Ivkovic

The Other Sound
Friday: Hannu Salama & Vapaat Radikaalit, Maarja Nuut & Ruum, Tuomas A. Laitinen, Aïsha Devi, Jlin AV with Theresa Baumgartner
Saturday: NYKY Ensemble, Tristero Piano Trio, Saba Alizadeh, Ana Gutieszca, Vessel featuring Pedro Maia, Amnesia Scanner
Sunday: Mary Lattimore, Kelly Moran, Lanark Artefax, Quadrivium, Bendik Giske

Red Garden
Friday: Electronic Market, Jussi Niskanen, La Persé featuring Ray Noir, Emkay, Bernardino Femminielli, Janne X, Fecal Matter, House of Disappointments, Sasu Kauppi, DJ Wekesa
Saturday: Zoukous, Irene Kostas & Fummer, Casio G URL, UHA, DJ Renaz, Cinquantesix, Coco Ninja, My Neck My Back, House of Mizrahi Finland, Kiddy Smile
Sunday: Julius, ОГНИ, 12 Months of Pride, DJ Irma & Helmz, Between, Slaya Bit, House of Auer, Dustin Muchuvitz, Gabber Eleganza, Senzei, Karoliina Pärnänen, Lara Silva

Champagne Bar & Lounge
Friday: Maria Wesander, Lassi Jahnsson, Kalle Karvanen, Peu, Tapa Paha Tapa, Juuso Tervo, Teemu Keisteri
Saturday: Milk
Sunday: Ottopetteri & Krash Bandicute, Jenny Om & Handshaking, DJ Aleksi & Skenikswee

2022
Main Stage
Friday: Antti Autio + Jouset, Vesala, Sigrid, Burna Boy, Gorillaz
Saturday: F, Gettomasa, Vesta, Princess Nokia, Florence and the Machine
Sunday: Gasellit, Chisu, Michael Kiwanuka, Nick Cave and the Bad Seeds

Red Arena by Lapin Kulta Pure
Friday: Rosa Coste, Erika Vikman, Ibe, Jarv Is..., MØ
Saturday: Jesse Markin, Dreamworld, Bikini Kill, Freddie Gibbs, Jamie xx
Sunday: Louie Blue, GoldLink, Black Midi, Fred Again

Free.fi Black Tent
Friday: Pehmoaino, New Ro, Aldous Harding, Arppa, M Huncho
Saturday: Hassan Maikal, Ege Zulu, Malla, Yeboyah, Holly Humberstone, Fontaines D.C.
Sunday: William, Sexmane, Donny Benét, Q, Acid Arab

Balloon 360°
Friday: Vilma Jää, Johanna Juhola Reaktori, Isaac Sene, Nihiloxica, Alfa Mist
Saturday: Umo & Jimi Tenor, Kit Sebastian, Linda Fredriksson Juniper, Lxandra, Orchestra Baobab
Sunday: Pekka Laine & The Enchanted, Timo Lassy & Teppo Mäkynen, Pepe Willberg & Jukka Eskola, Brandee Younger Trio, Mdou Moctar, Erika de Casier

Resident Advisor Front Yard
Friday: Irma & Helmz, Electronic Market, Katerina, Uncle Waffles, Dixon, The Blessed Madonna
Saturday: Emkay, Lara Silva, Morphology, Mono Junk, Antti Salonen, Sherelle, Anz, DJ Stingray 313, Marcel Dettmann
Sunday: Eric Filipus, Jenifa, Julio Victoria, Heléna Star, DJ Holographic, DJ Tennis, DJ Koze

Backyard
Friday: Soul Survivors, Zernell, DJ Renaz, Yung Singh, OK Williams, Kamma & Masalo
Saturday: DJ Jese, Hanna Ojanen, Trujillo, Bárbara Boeing, Millos Kaiser, Lil Tony, Danilo Plessow / MCDE
Sunday: Skidi Backyard, Zoukous, Esa, Jayda G, Antal

The Other Sound x Sun Effects
Friday: Heli Hartikainen, Project Vainiolla, Caterina Barbieri, Trains, Huoratron
Saturday: Katri Naukari & Janne Myllymäki, Nyky Ensemble, Ville Herrala & Antti Lötjönen, Marja Ahti, Cucina Povera, Tuomas A. Laitinen & Sapiduz Ensemble
Sunday: Ona Kamu, Ánnámáret, AT/PT, Smerz, Kmru, Islaja

Red Garden
Friday: Anna Vänttinen, Denzel, Liskokuningatar, Elina Tapio, Naks, Lazercat, Cardinal & Nun, Coco Ninja & Iconic House of Ninja, Mike Q
Saturday: OLB, DJ Wuf, Jaakko Rintala, Alec Sibbald, Essi Eirene, Eleonora Šljanda, Maria Wesander, Precious Bloom, Karlainthemix, Marcia Carr
Sunday: Lauri Soini, OK Sound, Jussi Kantonen, DJ Paulette, Giant Swan, Patrick Mason

Champagne Bar & Lounge
Friday: DJ Bunuel, Hitoshi, Joshi DJ, TBoy, Box'n'Dice
Saturday: Vesa Liede, Marc Fred, Miia Laine, Joseysradios, Cumbia Beat, DJ Wekesa
Sunday: Afro Sunday DJs

Flow Festival Ljubljana
Aside from Helsinki, Flow Festival was also held in Ljubljana, Slovenia at the Tobačna Mesto site. Flow Festival Ljubljana was only held once in 2015.

2015
Main Stage
Friday: The Stubs, Edo Maajka, José González, Metronomy
Saturday: Jardier, Jonathan, Torul, Bad Copy, Run the Jewels, Pet Shop Boys
Sunday: New Wave Syria, Artan Lili, Polona Kasal x KALU, Caribou, Róisín Murphy

Ljubljana Backyard
Friday: Symann, Ian F., Aneuria, Kiki, DJ Koze, Derrick May
Saturday: Splinterhouse, Niplodok, Trevor Deep Jr, Felver, Bonobo, San Proper, Hunee, Antal
Sunday: Fraku, Nitz, Roiss, Evano, Tijana T, Lil Tony, Dixon, Âme, Recondite

Gallery Bar
Friday: Disco Durum, Zhe, Bakto, Ule Nakova, Ichisan
Saturday: E.B. King, Wichiwaka, Tha Disko Don, Dulash Der, Vuka
Sunday: Loutseau, Sunny Sun, Woo D, Puff, Softskinson S.S.S., Marta

References

Music festivals established in 2004
Music festivals in Finland
Music festivals in Slovenia